Fantasy Club is the fourth studio album by Japanese producer tofubeats, and his third on a major label. It was released on May 24, 2017 through Warner Music Japan subsidiary unBORDE.

Background 
The album was inspired by the artist learning about the concept of "post-truth", and how he connected to the idea.

Release 
The album was released on May 24, 2017. The album had multiple singles, including "Shopping Mall", "Lonely Nights", and "Baby". "Baby" is also not present on the international version. The album contains noticeably less features than his previous albums. A remixes album, titled Fantasy Club Remixes & Instrumentals, was released on July 27, 2018.

Track listing

Chart positions

References 

Japanese-language albums
Tofubeats albums
Unborde albums
2017 albums